Seolhwa-Myeonggok Station is a Line 1 underground station of the Daegu Metro in Dalseong County Daegu, South Korea. This station is a southern terminus of Line 1. The station was opened on September 8, 2016, by the opening of the west extension between Seolhwa–Myeonggok and Daegok.

Station name
The Sulwha Myeonggok Station is a name that combines the two names of Sulwha-ri and Myeonggok-ri. In the case of Sulwha, there were many apricot trees growing in the village in the past. When spring comes, the apricot blossoms are like snowflakes, so they were called Sulwha. It was written as Seo (舌化), and it became the current narrative, and in the case of Myeonggok, the village was located in a valley and its shape was long and narrow like a home, so it was called Myeonggok.

Station layout

List of exits
There are 8 exits at this station:

Footnote

External links
 Cyber station information from Daegu Metropolitan Transit Corporation

Dalseong County
Railway stations opened in 2016
Daegu Metro stations